Cyperus crassipes is a species of sedge that is native to parts of Africa.

The species was first formally described by the botanist Martin Vahl in 1805.

See also 
 List of Cyperus species

References 

crassipes
Taxa named by Martin Vahl
Plants described in 1805
Flora of South Africa
Flora of Angola
Flora of Benin
Flora of Gabon
Flora of Ghana
Flora of Guinea
Flora of Ivory Coast
Flora of Kenya
Flora of Liberia
Flora of Madagascar
Flora of Mozambique
Flora of Nigeria
Flora of Senegal
Flora of Sierra Leone
Flora of Tanzania
Flora of the Republic of the Congo
Flora of the Democratic Republic of the Congo
Flora of Togo
Flora of Somalia